Rabi Singh (27 January 1931 – 2 February 2020) was an Odia poet, writer. Author of more than 50 books, he was a journalist and prominent politician as well.

Early life  
He was born Rabindranath Singh on 27 January 1931 at Sinharapur village of undivided Cuttack district (now Jagatsinghpur).
His parents were freedom fighters and he was involved in politics from an early age. He had little formal education but he was well versed in Odia, English and Bengali. In 1948 he joined Congress Socialist Party. Subsequently, in 1953 he joined Communist Party Of India. In 1955 he participated in Goa freedom movement. He was jailed during 1975 emergency.

Literary Activities  
He started writing after 1955. He was known as a Marxist and revolutionary poet. His poems reflected the pain and suffering of the exploited masses. His poem collection  was published before his marriage. For this he was awarded Odisha Sahitya Akademi award. He translated many Russian literary works to Odia.

Awards
 Odisha Sahitya Akademi Award - 1968
 Soviet Land Nehru Award - 
 Atibadi Jagannath Das Award - 2017

Bibliography 
Sources

Autobiography

References

1931 births
2020 deaths
People from Jagatsinghpur district
Odia-language poets
Poets from Odisha
Recipients of the Atibadi Jagannath Das Award
Recipients of the Odisha Sahitya Akademi Award
20th-century Indian poets
21st-century Indian poets